Thomas Finlayson may refer to:

Tommy Finlayson (Thomas James Finlayson, born 1938), Gibraltarian historian
Thomas Finlayson (Presbyterian minister) (1809–1872), Scottish Presbyterian minister